Mr. Mean is a 1977 action crime film written and directed by Fred Williamson.

Plot 
Mr. Mean is hired by a former Cosa Nostra henchman to kill a mafia leader named Ranati who is embarrassing the mafia by stealing from the impoverished through fake charitable organizations. He then becomes a target himself.

Cast
 Fred Williamson as Mr. Mean
 Lou Castel as Huberto
 Raimund Harmstorf as Rommell
 Crippy Yocard as Rene
 Antonio Maimone as Rico
 Rita Silva as Carla
 Pat Brocato as Tony
 David Mills as Lt. Rigoli
 Stelio Candelli as Ranati
 Tawfiq Said as Driver
 Angela Doria as Farm Girl
 Richard Oneto as Man
 Satch as Self
 Charles Borromel as Johnny
 Ohio Players as Themselves
 Angelo Ragusa as Thug (uncredited)
 Franco Ukmar as Thug (uncredited)

Production
Fred Williamson produced Mr. Mean while filming The Inglorious Bastards by taking the camera equipment and crew every weekend, without the producers’ knowledge. He wrote the story Monday to Friday and shot on the weekends what he had written that week.

Release
Mr. Mean was released theatrically with an "R" rating. It was later released on VHS by Rhino and on Blu-ray by Code Red.

Soundtrack 

The Ohio Players appear in the film as themselves and offer to play a song they have written for Fred Williamson's character Mr. Mean. They then play the title song "Mr. Mean" from the eponymous soundtrack album as the opening credits to the film roll. The soundtrack was released in December 1977.

Reception
The film review website Pulp International gave the film a negative review, writing of Williamson, "He should have done better, since this was his fifth go-round of nearly twenty in the director's chair. Possibly the studio messed up his final cut. Or, considerably more likely, it was a disaster from the snap." The review concludes that Williamson "just dropped the ball."

The film review website spicyonion.com wrote that "Mr. Mean certainly fulfills audience expectations".

Charlie Jane Anders of Gizmodo listed Mr. Mean as one of the reasons "you would think people would have learned not to fuck with Fred Williamson".

Brad Avery of vanyaland.com described Mr. Mean as one of Williamson's "more macho characters".

The Department of Afro American Research, Arts, and Culture added the film's poster to its archive, writing, "dead men tell no tales, but some men are just too mean to die!"

References

External links 
 

1977 films
1977 action films
1977 crime drama films
1970s action drama films
1970s crime action films
American action drama films
American crime action films
American crime drama films
Blaxploitation films
Films set in Los Angeles
Films set in Rome
Films shot in Los Angeles
Films shot in Rome
Films directed by Fred Williamson
Italian action drama films
Italian crime action films
Italian crime drama films
Mafia films
1970s English-language films
1970s American films
1970s Italian films